Ragweeds (Ambrosia species) are used as food plants by the caterpillars (larvae) of some Lepidoptera species including:

Monophagous species that feed exclusively on Ambrosia species
Bucculatrix leaf-miners:
B. agnella - feeds on A. artemisiifolia
B. franseriae - feeds on A. deltoidea
B. transversata - feeds on A. psilostachya
Chionodes mediofuscella
Schinia species
S. dobla - feeds on A. dumosa
S. rivulosa
S. sexplagiata - feeds on A. psilostachya
S. thoreaui

Polyphagous species that feed on Ambrosia species among other plants
Bucculatrix leaf-miners:
B. ambrosiaefoliella
B. pomifoliella
Schinia bifascia - recorded on A. trifida

External links

Ragweeds
+Lepidoptera